Kim Ki-hyeon (born June 24, 1945) is a South Korean voice actor. He joined the Munhwa Broadcasting Corporation's voice acting division in 1965.

Roles

Broadcast TV
24 (television) (replacing Tobin Bell by Season 2, Korea TV Edition, MBC)
Cubix (Dr. K, SBS)
MacGyver (replacing Dana Elcar, Korea TV Edition, MBC)
K-Cops (Korea TV Edition, MBC)
Brain Survivor (narration, MBC)
You're Under Arrest (Korea TV Edition, Tooniverse)
Miracle Girls (Korea TV Edition, MBC)
Penking & Liking (MBC)
My Little Pony: Friendship Is Magic（Korea TV Edition, Tooniverse）

Movie

Dubbing
Rules of Engagement (replacing Tommy Lee Jones, Korea TV Edition, MBC)
Deep Impact (replacing Robert Duvall, Korea TV Edition, MBC)
The Long Kiss Goodnight (replacing Samuel L. Jackson, Korea TV Edition, MBC)
Lethal Weapon 3 (replacing Stuart Wilson, Korea TV Edition, MBC)
Ricochet (replacing John Lithgow, Korea TV Edition, MBC)
Leon (replacing Jean Reno, Korea TV Edition, KBS)
The Hunchback of Notre Dame (replacing Anthony Queen, Korea TV Edition, KBS)
Clean (replacing Nick Nolte, Korea TV Edition, SBS)
Police Academy (replacing Lt. Moses Hightower, Korea TV Edition, MBC)
Up (replacing Christopher Plummer)

Actor
5th Republic (TV series) (2005)
 Flu (2013)
Steel Rain (2017)
Feel Good to Die (2018)

Game dubbing
Starcraft II (Zeratul, replacing Fred Tatasciore)

See also
Munhwa Broadcasting Corporation
MBC Voice Acting Division

References

External links
MBC Voice Acting Division Kim Ki-hyeon Blog 

Living people
South Korean male voice actors
1945 births
People from North Chungcheong Province